Düsseldorfer EG (short DEG) is a German professional ice hockey team in Düsseldorf. It was Germany's most successful hockey club for a long time and had many international players. The famous Eisstadion at the Brehmstrasse was the home venue for most of the team's history. The team now plays in the Deutsche Eishockey Liga (German Ice Hockey League, abbreviated DEL); the home venue is the ISS Dome.

The club was founded on 8 November 1935 as Düsseldorfer Eislauf Gemeinschaft (DEG) and was renamed DEG Metro Stars on 1 March 2002. It was renamed again as Düsseldorfer Eislauf-Gemeinschaft (DEG) in 2012.

Honors
 German champions 1967, 1972, 1975, 1990, 1991, 1992, 1993, 1996
 German Runner-up, 1969, 1971, 1973, 1980, 1981, 1986, 1989, 1994, 2006, 2009
 DEB-Pokal winners 2006
 DEB-Pokal Runner-up, 2005
 NRW state champion 1946
 Champion in the 2. Bundesliga 2000 (the DEG was two years in the 2nd division due to financial problems)
 2nd place in Eurocup 1991
 3rd place in Eurocup 1997
 Beat the NHL BLUE ALL-STARS team 3–1 in the first cross-league game of the team's history.

Players

Current roster

Honored members
10 Chris Valentine
12 Peter-John Lee
13 Walter Köberle
23 Daniel Kreutzer

Coaches

 1930s – Bobby Bell
 1952–53 – Rainer Hillmann
 1950s – Clare (Jimmy) Drake
 1950s – Gerald Strong
 1956–58 – Frank Trottier
 1958–62 – Vlastimil Suchoparek
 1962–65 – Engelbert Holderied
 1965–69 – Hans Rampf
 1969–70 – Dr. Ladislav Horsky
 1970–72 – Xaver Unsinn
 1972–73 – Jiri Pokorny
 1973–76 – Chuck Holdaway
 1976–77 – Hans Rampf
 1977 – George Agar
 1977–78 – Rudi Hejtmanek
 1978–79 – Otto Schneitberger
 1979–82 – Gerhard Kießling
 1982–83 – Jaromir Frycer
 1983–84 – Heinz Weisenbach
 1984–87 – Otto Schneitberger
 1987–88 – Brian Lefley
 1988–89 – Peter Johannson
 1989–90 – Peter Hejma
 1990–95 – Hans Zach
 1995–97 – Hardy Nilsson
 1997 – Hans Zach
 1997–98 – Chris Valentine
 1998–99 – Czeslaw Panek
 1999–01 – Gerhard Brunner
 2001–04 – Michael Komma
 2004 – Walter Köberle 
 2004–05 – Butch Goring
 2005–07 – Don Jackson
 2007 – Slavomir Lener
 2007–08 – Lance Nethery
 2008–10 – Harold Kreis
 2010–12 – Jeff Tomlinson
 2012–14 – Christian Brittig
 2014–17 – Christoph Kreutzer
 2017–18 – Mike Pellegrims
 2018 – Tobias Abstreiter
 2018–22 – Harold Kreis
 2022 – present – Roger Hansson

References

External links
 

Deutsche Eishockey Liga teams
Sport in Düsseldorf
Ice hockey teams in Germany
Ice hockey clubs established in 1935
1935 establishments in Germany